James Brooks House may refer to:

James H. Brooks House, Somerville, Massachusetts, listed on the NRHP in Massachusetts
James Brooks House (Dayton, Ohio), listed on the NRHP in Ohio

See also
Brooks House (disambiguation)